Erika's tuco-tuco (Ctenomys erikacuellarae), is a species of tuco-tuco native to Bolivia. It was named after Erika Cuéllar, a conservation biologist from Bolivia.

The holotype is held at the Museum of Southwestern Biology at the University of New Mexico MSB:Mamm:63391

References

Endemic fauna of Bolivia
Mammals of Bolivia
Tuco-tucos
Mammals described in 2014